Kharkiv State College of Physical Culture 1 is a sports college in Kharkiv and is subordinated to the Ministry of Education and Science of Ukraine. Note that in Kharkiv are two colleges of Physical Culture, one belongs to the Kharkiv Oblast, another is administered directly by the Government of Ukraine through the Ministry of Sports.

Departments
 Cycling
 Rowing
 Wrestling, free style
 Water polo
 Volleyball
 Lokomotyv-KhDVUFK (participates in the second division of Ukrainian competition as a farm club of Lokomotyv Kharkiv)
 Judo
 Athletics
 Track and field
 Swimming
 Swimming, synchronized
 Archery
 Taekwondo (WTF)
 Football
 UFK Olimpik

See also
 National University of Physical Education and Sport of Ukraine
 FC Olympik Kharkiv

References

External links
 Official website

 
Universities and colleges in Kharkiv
Sport schools in Ukraine